The 2019 Fórmula Academy Sudamericana Championship season is the fourth season of this series, and the second under the Fórmula Academy Sudamericana name. It began on the 8 September at Interlagos Circuit, in Brazil and finished on 8 December at the Autódromo Víctor Borrat Fabini in Uruguay after 4 rounds.

Drivers

Race calendar and results
The grid for race 2 is determined by the finishing order of race 1, but with the top 6 reversed.

Championship standings

Points system
Points were awarded as follows:

Fórmula Academy Sudamericana Championship
Juan Vieira became a two time winner of the series.

References

External links
 

Fórmula 4 Sudamericana seasons
Sudamericana
Formula 4
Formula 4